Shorea scrobiculata is a tree in the family Dipterocarpaceae. The specific epithet scrobiculata means "sawdust-like", referring to the indumentum of the flowers.

Description
The yellowish to brown bark is cracked and flaky. The inflorescences bear pink flowers.

Distribution and habitat
Shorea scrobiculata is native to Peninsular Malaysia and Borneo.

Conservation
Shorea scrobiculata has been assessed as near threatened on the IUCN Red List. It is threatened by conversion of land for palm oil and other plantations. It is also threatened by logging for its timber and by human settlement and mining. Shorea scrobiculata does occur in a number of protected areas.

References

scrobiculata
Flora of Peninsular Malaysia
Flora of Borneo
Plants described in 1887
Taxa named by William Burck